Grigor Dimitrov defeated David Ferrer in the final, 2–6, 6–3, 6–4 to win the singles tennis title at the 2013 If Stockholm Open. It was his maiden ATP Tour title.

Tomáš Berdych was the defending champion, but chose not to compete.

Seeds
The first four seeds received a bye into the second round.

Draw

Finals

Top half

Bottom half

Qualifying

Seeds

Qualifiers

Qualifying draw

First qualifier

Second qualifier

Third qualifier

Fourth qualifier

References
 Main Draw
 Qualifying Draw

If Stockholm Open - Singles
2013 Singles